Magic Bay (Spanish title: Bahía mágica) is a 2002 Argentine animated adventure film combining a human cast with animated figures, directed by Marina Valentini and script written by José María Paolantonio based on a book by Ricardo Wullicher.

Release
The film premiered in Argentina on 26 December 2002.

Cast
Alfredo Allende -  Marinero Alex
Carlos Álvarez-Novoa - Bartolo
Mariano Arenas - Narrator
Fabián Arenillas -  Assistante Dr. Rato
Eduardo Avakian -  Voz del loro
Aldo Barbero -  Voz de Tibor
Roberto Carnaghi
Francisco Corbalán -  Raúl
Martín Coria -  Pescador
Débora Cuenca -  Chica del bote
Edson da Silva Pinheiro -  Científica brasileño
Soledad Delgadollo -  Entrenadora Soledad
Camila Deppe -  Hermanita de Raúl
Eduardo Ferrari -  Voz del Tiburón y del Pulpo
Freddy Friedlander -  Científico alemán
Luis Herrera - Assistante del Dr. Rato
Pablo Ini - Doblaje de Pedro
Hugo Koghan -  Marinero Angel
Liz Lobato
Daniel Miglioli - Prefecto
Luciano Nóbile - Quique
Jean Pierre Noher
Francisco Olmo - Dr. Rato
Elvira Onetto - Dra. Ronsky
Omar Pini
Fernando Rivas Goncalvez -  Niño dominicano
Ricardo Rodríguez - Pedro
Mariela Samaniego -  Mamá de Raúl
Rosario Sánchez Almada -  Voz de la Gaviota y de la Tortuga
Adolfo Stambulsky -       Voz del Delfín y del Pez Rayado
Gustavo Wagner -      Dueño del parque
Juan Diego West -      Chico del bote

External links

2002 films
2002 animated films
2000s adventure films
Argentine animated films
2000s Spanish-language films
Films with live action and animation
2000s Argentine films